Zeitgeist is the fourth album by the Levellers. It was released in 1995 and reached 1 in the UK album charts, making it the band's most successful album.  Two singles were released from the album – "Hope St.", which reached No.12 in the UK single charts, and "Fantasy", which reached 16. Additionally, a re-recorded version of "Just the One" featuring Joe Strummer was released, reaching No.12, as well as a live version of "Exodus" from the later Headlights, White Lines, Black Tar Rivers (Best Live) album the next year, which reached No.24.

Track listing
 "Hope St."
 "The Fear"
 "Exodus"
 "Maid of the River"
 "Saturday to Sunday"
 "4 a.m."
 "Forgotten Ground"
 "Fantasy"
 "P.C. Keen"
 "Just the One"
 "Haven't Made It"
 "Leave This Town"
 "Men-an-Tol"

The 2007 re-issue included the bonus tracks:
 "Miles Away"
 "Your 'Ouse"
 "Drinking for England"
 "Searchlights"

Personnel

Musicians
 Mark Chadwick - guitars, vocals
 Charlie Heather - drums/percussion
 Jeremy Cunningham - bass guitar, artwork
 Simon Friend - guitars, vocals, mandolin
 Jonathan Sevink - fiddle

Guest musicians
Joe Strummer - piano on "Just the One'

Charts

Weekly charts

Year-end charts

References

Levellers (band) albums
1995 albums
China Records albums